Illia Piltenko (born January 20, 1993) is a Ukrainian footballer playing with FC Vorkuta in the Canadian Soccer League.

Playing career  
Piltenko played in the Ukrainian Amateur Football League with FC Khimik Sieverodonetsk. In 2015, he played in the professional ranks with FC Helios Kharkiv in the Ukrainian First League. The following season he played in the Ukrainian Second League with NK Veres Rivne, but midway through the season he played with MFC Kremin Kremenchuk. Throughout his time in the Ukrainian Second League he played with FC Enerhiya Nova Kakhovka, and FC Nikopol. In 2018, he returned to the Ukrainian Amateur Football League to play with FC Peremoha Dnipro. 

In 2019, he played abroad in the Canadian Soccer League with FC Vorkuta. The following season he featured in the CSL Championship final against Scarborough SC and assisted in securing the championship. In 2021, he assisted in securing Vorkuta's third regular season title, and secured the ProSound Cup against Scarborough. He also played in the 2021 playoffs where Vorkuta was defeated by Scarborough in the championship final.

Honors 
FC Vorkuta

 CSL Championship: 2020
 Canadian Soccer League First Division/Regular Season: 2019, 2021 
ProSound Cup: 2021

References 

1993 births
Living people
FC Helios Kharkiv players
FC Kremin Kremenchuk players
FC Enerhiya Nova Kakhovka players
FC Nikopol players
FC Continentals players
Ukrainian First League players
Canadian Soccer League (1998–present) players
Ukrainian footballers
Association football defenders
Ukrainian Second League players